Hey Arnold!: The Movie (also known as Arnold Saves the Neighborhood) is a 2002 American animated adventure comedy film based on the Nickelodeon animated television series of the same name. It was directed by Tuck Tucker and written by series creator Craig Bartlett (who also produced the film) and Steve Viksten, with music by series composer Jim Lang. The events of the film take place during the fifth and final season of Hey Arnold!. The film stars Spencer Klein, Francesca Smith, Jamil Walker Smith, Dan Castellaneta, Tress MacNeille, Paul Sorvino, and Jennifer Jason Leigh. The film follows Arnold, Gerald, and Helga on a quest to save their neighborhood from a greedy developer who plans on converting it into a huge shopping mall.

The film was produced by Nickelodeon Movies, Snee-Oosh, Inc. and Nickelodeon Animation Studio, and was released on June 28, 2002, by Paramount Pictures. It was the third film made by Nickelodeon Movies to be based on a Nicktoon, after The Rugrats Movie and Rugrats in Paris: The Movie. It is also the first Nickelodeon film based on a Nicktoon to get a PG rating from the MPAA. It grossed $15.2 million worldwide against a production budget of $3–$4 million.

A made for television sequel entitled Hey Arnold!: The Jungle Movie aired on November 24, 2017.

Plot

Arriving home from a basketball game, Arnold Shortman and his best friend Gerald Johanssen learn that FutureTech Industries (FTI) CEO Alphonse Perrier du von Scheck has announced plans to redevelop the entire neighborhood as a luxurious high-rise shopping mall. That night, Helga Pataki finds that her father, Big Bob, is working with FTI to build a new super-sized branch of his beeper store in the proposed mall. She ultimately sides with her father, though is hesitant to do so because of her love for Arnold.

Arnold hosts a demonstration against FTI, but it fails when their permit is stolen by Scheck's employees and Arnold's grandmother Gertie Shortman is arrested, causing the neighbors to lose hope and sell their homes to FTI. Just as the fate of the neighborhood appears to be sealed, Grandpa Phil tells Arnold the story of the "Tomato Incident", a major Revolutionary War battle fought in the city. Arnold realizes that the neighborhood had to have been declared a historic district after the war, effectively ensuring its preservation. Arnold and Gerald search throughout the city for the legal document certifying its landmark status, and ultimately discover that the document was sold to Scheck, who denies obtaining the document.

As the deadline draws near, Arnold gets a mysterious phone call from "Deep Voice" (a "Deep Throat"-esque character), who informs Arnold that Scheck actually has the document inside his office safe, and is lying that he does not know its whereabouts. Arnold and Gerald steal the key to the safe from Scheck's assistant, Nick Vermicelli. Nick later notices the missing key, and informs Scheck. Meanwhile, Phil and the boarders try to devise a backup plan to stop the bulldozers from destroying the neighborhood in case Arnold's plan fails. The plan is to wire the storm drain tunnels beneath their street with dynamite to intercept FTI's construction equipment. Big Bob later teams up with them after discovering Nick's contract states Scheck will control 51% of his company and swindle him as a result.

With help from agent Bridget, Arnold and Gerald infiltrate the FTI headquarters, only for them to discover that Scheck has the document in his hand. Scheck then tells his own family's story regarding the Tomato Incident. His ancestor, the governor of the local British forces, was defeated and humiliated by the American colonists including Arnold's ancestors during the "Tomato Incident". To avenge his family's honor, Scheck intends to demolish the neighborhood and replace it with a building carrying his name on it. He destroys the document to ensure that his plans will proceed, before summoning his guards to get rid of Arnold and Gerald. They escape, but believe they have failed, until "Deep Voice" advises Arnold to obtain the FTI's security-camera footage of Scheck burning the document.

Arnold discovers that "Deep Voice" is Helga, who reluctantly admits she loves him and that this was her reason for getting involved. He and Helga escape the building, and meet Gerald on a city bus, convincing the driver Murray to race home when realizing that his girlfriend Mona lives in the same neighborhood. Despite several near-collisions, the kids eventually make it back unharmed. Mayor Dixie arrives at the scene, along with the police and a news crew. Accessing the large ScheckVision jumbotron poised atop a nearby building, Arnold and Bridget show everyone the footage of Scheck burning the document. Dixie officially restores the neighborhood's status as a historic site, never to be destroyed by anyone for any purpose.

Scheck arrives, demanding to know why demolition has not begun. He sees the footage of himself burning the document on the monitor, and realizes he is caught and facing prison time. Having escaped prison, Gertie sabotages his car, and Scheck is promptly arrested. Harold inadvertently sits down on the detonator that ignites Phil's explosives, causing the jumbotron monitor to be destroyed. Helga denies loving Arnold, claiming her confession was made in "the heat of the moment". While Arnold is unconvinced, he pretends to accept it as she returns home.

Voice cast

 Spencer Klein as Arnold Shortman
 Francesca Marie Smith as Helga Pataki and Deep Voice
 Jamil Walker Smith as Gerald Johanssen and Rasta Guy
 Dan Castellaneta as Grandpa Phil Shortman and Nick Vermicelli
 Tress MacNeille as Grandma Gertie Shortman, Mayor Dixie, and Red
 Paul Sorvino as Alphonse Perrier du von Scheck
 Jennifer Jason Leigh as Bridget
 Christopher Lloyd as Coroner
 Maurice LaMarche as Big Bob Pataki and Head of Security
 Sam Gifaldi as Sid
 Christopher P. Walberg as Stinky Peterson
 Olivia Hack as Rhonda Lloyd
 Blake McIver Ewing as Eugene Horowitz
 Anndi McAfee as Phoebe Heyerdahl
 Justin Shenkarow as Harold Berman
 Vincent Schiavelli as Mr. Bailey
 Kath Soucie as Miriam Pataki, Mona, and Reporter
 James Keane as Marty Green and Riot Cop
 Elizabeth Ashley as Mrs. Vitello
 Michael Levin as Ray Doppel
 Steve Viksten as Oskar Kokoshka
 Dom Irrera as Ernie Potts
 Baoan Coleman as Mr. Hyunh
 Craig Bartlett as Brainy, Murray, Grubby, and Monkeyman

Production
In 1998, Nickelodeon renewed Hey Arnold! for a fourth season, and gave creator Craig Bartlett the chance to develop two feature-length adaptations. As work on the fifth season was completing, in 2001, Bartlett and company engaged in the production of the first film, titled Arnold Saves the Neighborhood. The Neighborhood project was originally produced for television and home video as the last 3 episodes of season 5, but eventually became Hey Arnold!: The Movie when executives at Paramount Pictures decided to release it theatrically after successful test screenings. According to animation historian Jerry Beck (in his Animated Movie Guide), the decision was also buoyed by the financial success of the first two Rugrats films, The Rugrats Movie and Rugrats in Paris: The Movie.

Release
The first trailer was released theatrically in December 2001 with Jimmy Neutron: Boy Genius. A second trailer consisting of new animation debuted during the 2002 Kids' Choice Awards. They showed segments on Nickelodeon called "Backyard Players" where kids would play Arnold, Gerald, and Helga and act out scenes from the film. There was a contest held for a lucky winner to be Arnold for a day and go to the film's premiere. The song 2-Way by Lil' Romeo was used to help promote the film.

Hey Arnold!: The Movie was Nickelodeon's first animated feature to receive a PG rating from the Motion Picture Association of America (MPAA) for thematic elements.

Box office
Opening on June 28, 2002, in the United States, the film grossed over $15 million worldwide on a budget of $3–4 million. The film grossed $5.7 million, averaging $2,258 from 2,527 theaters, and ranking #6 for the weekend. It dropped 65% in its second weekend, grossing $2 million, falling to #14, averaging $793 from 2,534 theaters, and bringing the 10-day total to $10.7 million. In its third weekend, it dropped another 70%, grossing $610,028, falling to #20, averaging $302 from 2,021 theaters, and bringing the 17-day total to $12.6 million. The film closed on August 22, 2002, grossing a total of $13.7 million in the US and $1.5 million internationally.

Home media
Hey Arnold!: The Movie was released on VHS and DVD on December 31, 2002 by Paramount Home Entertainment. The film was released on Blu-ray on February 15, 2022.

Reception
The website's critical consensus reads: "Bland, unoriginal and lacking the wit of the TV series, Hey Arnold! is a 30-minute cartoon stretched beyond its running time." Metacritic assigned the film a weighted average score of 47 out of 100 based on 23 critics, indicating "mixed or average reviews". Audiences polled by CinemaScore gave the film an average grade of "B+" on an A+ to F scale.

Video game
THQ released a video game of the film, exclusively for the Game Boy Advance. The game consists of five worlds, with four levels each (each including a boss on the fourth level) and the player can play as Arnold, Gerald, Grandpa, and Grandma. Helga is playable only with a cheat code found on various websites.

Future 
A second film, titled Hey Arnold!: The Jungle Movie, was in production but due to the disappointing results of the first film, the project was cancelled. Bartlett later left Nickelodeon, resulting in Hey Arnold!s cancellation, with the last episode airing on Nickelodeon on June 8, 2004, unannounced. In 2015, it was announced that The Jungle Movie had resumed production as a TV film. The film was first broadcast on Nickelodeon and sister networks TeenNick and Nicktoons in the United States on November 24, 2017. The film was later broadcast on Nickelodeon channels and select theatres worldwide in 2018. The debut airing was simulcast on Nickelodeon, TeenNick, and Nicktoons.

See also

 List of American films of 2002
 List of animated feature-length films

References

External links

 
 
 
 

Hey Arnold!
2002 films
2002 animated films
2000s American animated films
American children's animated adventure films
American children's animated comedy films
Animated films about friendship
Animated films based on animated series
Animated films about children
Nickelodeon animated films
Nickelodeon Movies films
Paramount Pictures animated films
Paramount Pictures films
2002 directorial debut films
2000s English-language films